Roses are woody perennials of the genus Rosa.

Roses or Rose's may also refer to:

In places
 Roses, Girona, Catalonia, Spain
 Roses Stores, a discount store
 Roses Theatre, cinema/theatre/venue in Gloucestershire, England

In food and drink

 Cadbury Roses, a confectionery
 Rose's (marmalade), a British marmalade owned by Premier Foods
 Rose's lime juice, a British concentrated drink

In media, arts, and entertainment

 Roses (Krøyer), an 1893 painting by Danish painter P. S. Krøyer
 Still Life: Vase with Pink Roses (Van Gogh), an 1890 oil painting by Vincent van Gogh

In music

Artists
 The Stone Roses, English rock band

Albums
 Roses  (Cœur de pirate album), 2015
 Roses (The Cranberries album), 2012
 Roses (Dragon album), 2014
 Roses (Kathy Mattea album), 2002

Songs
 "Roses" (Benny Blanco and Juice Wrld song), 2018
 "Roses" (The Chainsmokers song), 2015
 "Roses" (MacKenzie Bourg song), 2016
 "Roses" (Outkast song), 2004
 "Roses" (Saint Jhn song), 2016
 "Roses", by Adam Lambert from Velvet
 "Roses", by Angus & Julia Stone from Angus & Julia Stone
 "Roses", by BJ the Chicago Kid from 1123
 "Roses", by Carly Rae Jepsen from Emotion: Side B
 "Roses", by Cherry Ghost from Thirst for Romance
 "Roses", by Chris Brown from Heartbreak on a Full Moon
 "Roses", by dEUS from In A Bar, Under The Sea
 "Roses", by Janis Ian from Aftertones
 "Roses", by Kanye West from Late Registration
 "Roses", by Kelsea Ballerini from Unapologetically
 "Roses", by Laleh from Me and Simon
 "Roses", by Luke Christopher from TMRW
 "Roses", by Mary J. Blige from Growing Pains
 "Roses", by Men Without Hats from No Hats Beyond This Point
 "Roses", by Nas from Life Is Good
 "Roses", by Nik Kershaw from The Riddle
 "Roses", by Poets of the Fall from Carnival of Rust
 "Roses", by Seether from Holding Onto Strings Better Left to Fray
 "Roses", by Shawn Mendes from Illuminate
 "Roses", by Silverchair from Freak Show
 "Roses/Lotus/Violet/Iris", by Hayley Williams from Petals for Armor
 "Roses", by Dick Haymes, single, 1950
 "Roses", by Jim Reeves from Moonlight and Roses, 1964

In sports
 Roses Tournament, a sports tournament between York and Lancaster universities
 England national netball team, known as the Roses

In other uses
 Wars of the Roses, a series of bloody dynastic civil wars for the throne of England

See also
 Roses Are Red
 Rose (disambiguation)
 Rozès, French commune
 Rozes (musician) (born 1993), American musician